The 1894 Georgia Tech football team represented the Georgia Institute of Technology during the 1894 college football season. It was the team's 3rd ever season.

Schedule

References

Georgia Tech
Georgia Tech Yellow Jackets football seasons
College football winless seasons
Georgia Tech fotball